Charles Humphrey Fuller (January 14, 1859 in Newark, New Jersey – December 5, 1938) was an American lawyer and politician from New York.

Life
He graduated from Amherst College. He practiced law in New York City. He married Mary Everett Webb (1862–1953), and they had several children.

Fuller was a member of the New York State Assembly (Kings Co., 18th D.) in 1905; and of the New York State Senate (8th D.) in 1907 and 1908.

He died on December 5, 1938, and was buried at the Sleepy Hollow Cemetery in North Tarrytown (now Sleepy Hollow).

U.S. Secretary of Commerce William C. Redfield (1858–1932) was his brother-in-law.

Sources
 Official New York from Cleveland to Hughes by Charles Elliott Fitch (Hurd Publishing Co., New York and Buffalo, 1911, Vol. IV; pg. 350 and 366)
 C. H. FULLER DIES; RETIRED LAWYER in NYT on December 6, 1938 (subscription required)

External links
 

1859 births
1938 deaths
Democratic Party New York (state) state senators
Politicians from Brooklyn
Democratic Party members of the New York State Assembly
Amherst College alumni
Politicians from Newark, New Jersey
Lawyers from Newark, New Jersey